Manjusha Kulkarni-Patil (born 1971) is a Hindustani classical music vocalist. She belongs to the Gwalior gharana.

Early life
Manjusha Kulkarni-Patil was born in Sangli, Maharashtra, India on 2 November 1971 in a family of musicians. She started learning at the age of twelve from Chintubua Mhaiskar. She has a Master of Arts in Music and also has the Sangeet Visharad degree awarded by the Akhil Bharatiya Gandharva Mahavidyalaya, Miraj. She got an opportunity to study music under able guidance of Late Sangeetacharya Pt. D.V. Kanebuwa of Agra and Gwalior Gharanas for 12 years. Presently she is taking guidance from Padmashri Pt. Ulhas Kashalkar and Dr. Vikas Kashalkar. Manjusha secured first position in the M.A (Music) examination and also received the Sangeet Visharad degree awarded by the Akhil Bharatiya Gandharva Mahavidyalaya, Miraj. She is an 'A' grade artist for classical and semi-classical music on All India Radio.

Career
Manjusha Kulkarni-Patil is known for her Khayal form of Hindustani music. She also excels in Semi Classical Musical forms like Thumari, Bhajan and Natya-Sangeet etc. She performs at all major classical music festivals like Sawai Gandharva Bhimsen Festival, Tansen festival. Manjusha has performed at various music conferences all over India and abroad like UAE, Muscat and U.S.A. Some of them included Sawai Gandharva Mahotsav, Pune, Tansen Samaroha, Gwalior, All Bengal Music Festival, Kolkata, Malhar Festival, Nehru Centre, Mumbai, Kala Akadami, Goa, Sur Mandal, Hyderabad, Akashwani Sangeet Sammelan, Chandigadh, Sangeet Ashram, Dover Lane Kolkata, Kalakshetra, Chennai, BMM Convention at Chicago, USA.

Awards
 Pandit Jasraj Gaurav Puraskar
 Manik Verma Puraskar
 Guruvarya B S Upadhye Smruti Puraskar - 2010
 Sangeet Shiromani Puraskar in 2008.  
 Ustad Bismillah Khan Yuva Award in 2012.
 Kumar Gandharv award 2016-17(by mp govt.)
 Ambition Award by the Career Institute in Sehore.

Discography
 Raga Bihag, Natyasangeet & Bhajan
 Raga Barwa & Raga Poorvi
 Raga Multani (Live Concert)
 Raga Desi & Raga Gauri

References

External links
 swarmanjusha.com

1971 births
Hindustani singers
Living people
Gwalior gharana
People from Sangli
Women Hindustani musicians
Singers from Maharashtra
20th-century Indian women classical singers
Women musicians from Maharashtra
21st-century Indian women classical singers